Ahlsdorf is a municipality in the Mansfeld-Südharz district, Saxony-Anhalt, Germany.

References

Municipalities in Saxony-Anhalt
Mansfeld-Südharz